Aarne Frithiof Louis Castrén (2 September 1923 – 2 January 1997) was a Finnish sailor. He competed in the 5.5 Metre event at the 1952 Summer Olympics.

References

External links
 
 

1923 births
1997 deaths
Finnish male sailors (sport)
Olympic sailors of Finland
Sailors at the 1952 Summer Olympics – 5.5 Metre
Sportspeople from Helsinki